Scratchy Bottom (or Scratchy's Bottom) is a clifftop valley between Durdle Door and Bat's Head in Dorset, England. A dry valley in the chalk, it is surrounded by farmland at its sides and landward end, with cliffs at the seaward end.

The name is thought to refer to a rough hollow. Scratchy Bottom has been noted for its unusual place name. The location came second after Shitterton, also in Dorset, in a 2012 poll for "Britain's worst place name" carried out by the genealogy website Find My Past.

Scratchy Bottom was the location for the opening of the 1967 film Far from the Madding Crowd, in a scene in which Gabriel Oak's sheep are driven over a cliff by his sheepdog.

References

External links
Durdle Door, Dorset

Valleys of Dorset
Jurassic Coast